The 1998 Azores Islands earthquake (also known as the Faial earthquake) struck with an epicenter in the Atlantic Ocean, off the Azores Islands of Portugal at 05:19 local time. The shallow ( deep) mainshock, which measured 6.1 on the moment magnitude scale caused significant damage on the island of Faial and Corvo. At least 10 people died, 100 were injured, and 2,500 people were left without homes.

Tectonic setting
The Azores Islands mark the location where the African (Nubian), Eurasian and North American plates meet at the ride-ridge-fault Azores Triple Junction. To the west is the Mid-Atlantic ridge; a 16,000-km-long divergent boundary on the seafloor of the Atlantic Ocean which separates the Eurasian Plate from the North American Plate. East of the Azores is the Azores–Gibraltar Transform Fault, specifically the strike-slip Gloria Fault which serves as the boundary between the Nubian and Eurasian plates. The plate boundaries are seismically active and capable of producing large earthquakes.

The Portuguese founded the first settlements on the islands in the 15th century. Since its founding, there has been at least 30 damaging and deadly earthquakes. The first recorded damaging earthquake occurred in 1522—it destroyed Vila Franca do Campo and caused over 5,000 deaths. Deadly earthquakes were also reported in 1787 and 1980. The largest recorded earthquake in the vicinity of the Azores was the 1941 magnitude 8.3 event which was associated with strike-slip faulting on the Eurasian–Nubian plate boundary.

Earthquake
The earthquake off the coast of Faial Island occurred as a result of pure strike-slip faulting. The two fault plane solutions suggest the earthquake was the outcome of strike-slip faulting on either a northwest–southeast striking left-lateral fault, or a northeast–southwest striking right-lateral fault. Seismological data from the earthquake support the occurrence of a rupture on the latter solution, which is also consistent with the plate tectonics in the Azores Islands. The shock represented a rare and large earthquake of tectonic origin; most earthquakes on the islands are of volcanic origin. The strike-slip faulting mechanism was also unusual as most tectonic earthquakes display normal faulting.

Seismicity
At 05:01, a strong earthquake struck near the epicenter of the mainshock. It woke residents near the epicenter and at Horta. Following the mainshock was a major aftershock sequence which persisted for four months. An estimated 10,600 aftershocks were recorded in the four-month period, many of them perceivable by residents in the affected area. Analysing the locations of aftershocks associated with the mainshock, the event likely caused some normal faulting on the Faial Graben onshore on Faial Island.

Impact

The earthquake was assigned a maximum Modified Mercalli intensity scale and European macroseismic scale intensity of VIII in the northeastern corner of Faial Island, where the greatest destruction was observed. Approximately 35 percent of all buildings on Faial Island were damaged or destroyed. On the nearby island of Pico, only 10 percent of its structures were affected, bringing the total number of affected structures to 3,909. Over 2,100 buildings up to 30 km away from the epicenter sustained serious structural damage. Serious damage included the complete collapse of masonry walls and large cracks appearing in exterior walls.

A large number of schools on both islands were moderately damaged; the most affected was a kindergarten in Salão, where its external masonry walls collapsed, leading to the demolition of the entire structure. At a school in Espalhafatos, the earthquake caused the separation of concrete and reinforced masonry components in the structure. Many of the schools inspected for damage were constructed of reinforced-concrete thus received slight or no damage.

Many churches which were severely damaged had been constructed of predominantly masonry materials. Only recently were three churches constructed with reinforced concrete. Common damage patterns associated with churches point to shear failure of walls. The Ribeirinha Church was one of the most seriously affected churches; the arch between the nave and apse completely collapsed.

Aftermath
António Guterres, the then Prime Minister of Portugal, was flown to Faial Island to survey the devastation. The United States ambassador to Portugal, Gerald S. McGowan, declared the earthquake a disaster on 17 July. In response, the Office of Foreign Disaster Assistance aided US$20,000 to the U.S embassy in for the Government of Portugal to purchase lavatory items and distribute them to the affected communities. The Portuguese government sent medical doctors and nurses to treat the injured victims on the islands. Sniffer dogs and medical aid were also transported to help in rescue missions. The Portuguese Air Force deployed a Lockheed C-130 Hercules transport plane from Lisbon with tents for 1,000 people and several thousand blankets.

See also
List of earthquakes in 1998
List of earthquakes in the Azores
List of earthquakes in Portugal

References

1998 earthquakes
Earthquakes in Portugal
1998 in Portugal
January 1998 events in Europe
Azores
History of the Azores
Faial Island